The Bangladeshi football league system contains two wide open national leagues, three Dhaka based leagues and one age-level amateur league.

Current system

System by period

See also
Bangladesh Premier League
Bangladesh Championship League
Dhaka Senior Division League 
Dhaka League (East Bengal & East Pakistan era) 
Dhaka League (Independent Bangladesh)
Dhaka Premier Division League (Restructured)
Dhaka Second Division Football League
Dhaka Third Division Football League 
Bangladesh Pioneer Football League

References

External links
 Official website of BFF

 
Football league systems in Asia